The Gibson ES-225 is a thinline hollowbody electric guitar model produced by the Gibson Guitar Corporation between 1955 and 1959.  It is notable as the first thinline hollowbody guitar produced by Gibson.

History

The ES-225 was originally introduced in 1955 as the ES-225T, a thinline hollowbody guitar featuring a Florentine cutaway, the Les Paul combined bridge and tailpiece (also used on the Les Paul from 1952–1953 and on the ES-295), a laminated pickguard, and a single P-90 pickup mounted in an unusual position midway between the bridge and the end of the fingerboard. From 1956 the ES-225TD, a twin pickup model with conventional pickup positioning, was also available.Both models had a tobacco sunburst finish, with more expensive natural finish models (ES225TN and ES-225TDN) also available from 1956.

Specifications
The specifications remained the same during the period the guitars were manufactured, with the exception that in 1959 a few guitars were made with separate trapeze-style tailpieces and floating Tune-o-matic bridges.  

When the guitar was initially marketed it was the first thinline hollowbody guitar Gibson had produced, preceding the Byrdland and ES-350T models.  In 1959 the ES-225 was phased out in favour of the ES-330 and ES-125T models.

Reception
Gibson shipped 5,220 of the single pickup ES-225 and 2,754 of the twin pickup models.

References

ES-225
Semi-acoustic guitars
1955 in music